Gerardo Trejos Salas  (August 19, 1946– April 17, 2012) was a Costa Rican politician.

References

1946 births
2012 deaths
Broad Front (Costa Rica) politicians
Place of birth missing